Reginald Everard Vibart Thompson-Lambe (born 4 February 1991), known as Reggie Lambe, is a Bermudian footballer who plays as a midfielder for Isthmian League North Division side AFC Sudbury.

Lambe is a Bermudian national team player, making his first appearance at age 16 against St Kitts and Nevis in December 2007, and holds the record for the most caps for Bermuda.

Club career
Lambe began his professional career with Ipswich Town, joining from Bermudian club Dandy Town Hornets, playing on the youth team and eventually joining the reserve squad, as well as making a first team appearance in a League Cup match against Shrewsbury Town. Lambe made his league debut in Ipswich Town's victory over Middlesbrough at Riverside Stadium on 7 August 2010, replacing Carlos Edwards in the 64th minute. The game ended in a 3–1 win for Ipswich Town.

Lambe joined Bristol Rovers on loan on 24 March 2011. While with Rovers Lambe made seven league appearances.

Lambe signed with Canadian club Toronto FC, of Major League Soccer (MLS), on 7 December 2011. Lambe scored his first goal(s) for Toronto in league play, scoring twice against Chicago Fire on 21 April, the game ended in a 3–2 home defeat. Lambe helped Toronto win the 2012 Canadian Championship with two goals, tying him with three other players for the Canadian Championship Golden Boot. He was put on waivers by Toronto FC on 5 March 2014.

After being waived by Toronto FC, Lambe joined Nyköpings BIS of Sweden's Division 1 Norra.  Over three months, Lambe made twelve appearances for the club, scoring one goal before leaving. After leaving Nyköpings, Lambe had a short trial with Mansfield Town before officially signing for the club for the 2014–15 season on 17 September 2014. Three days later, Lambe was named to the lineup as a substitute for Mansfield Town's league match against Carlisle United. Lambe went on to debut for the club in the match, coming on as a 74th-minute substitute for Fergus Bell.

Lambe joined League Two rivals Carlisle United in June 2016. He scored on his debut in a 1–1 draw with Portsmouth on 6 August 2016.

At the end of the 2017–18 season he was released by Carlisle.

On 28 June 2018 Lambe joined League Two club Cambridge United on a two-year contract. He scored his first goal for Cambridge in a 3–1 EFL Trophy loss to Southend United on 4 September 2018.

In 2020 Lambe signed for Stowmarket Town. Lambe scored on his debut in a 5–0 F.A. Vase win over Eynesbury Rovers. He left to join AFC Sudbury in February 2023.

International career
After representing Bermuda's under-15's, Lambe made his first full international appearance for Bermuda as a 16-year-old against St Kitts and Nevis in December 2007.

On 30 August 2008, Lambe scored four goals for his national team, in a 7–0 defeat of Saint Martin; a Digicel Cup match. These were his first goals for his country.

In May 2019 Lambe was named to the 2019 CONCACAF Gold Cup squad ahead of Bermuda's first ever participation at the tournament. In June 2022 he became Bermuda's most-capped player when he made his forty-fourth appearance for the national team.

Career statistics

Club

International

Scores and results list Bermuda's goal tally first, score column indicates score after each Lambe goal.

Honours
Toronto FC
Canadian Championship: 2012

Individual
Canadian Championship Golden Boot: 2012 (shared)

References

External links
Mansfield Town FC profile

Caribbean Football Database profile

1991 births
Living people
People from Hamilton, Bermuda
Bermudian footballers
Bermuda international footballers
Association football midfielders
Ipswich Town F.C. players
Bristol Rovers F.C. players
Toronto FC players
Nyköpings BIS players
Mansfield Town F.C. players
Carlisle United F.C. players
Cambridge United F.C. players
Stowmarket Town F.C. players
A.F.C. Sudbury players
Bermudian expatriate footballers
Expatriate footballers in England
Expatriate soccer players in Canada
Bermudian expatriate sportspeople in England
Bermudian expatriate sportspeople in Canada
Expatriate footballers in Sweden
English Football League players
Major League Soccer players
2019 CONCACAF Gold Cup players
Bermuda youth international footballers